The Nationals is an electronic sports (Esports) league in the Philippines which had its inaugural season in 2019. It is the first franchise-based electronic sports in the Philippines. The tournaments are sanctioned by the Esports National Association of the Philippines (ESNAP).

History

Establishment
The Nationals was first announced in June 2018 with its inaugural season which began in the first quarter of 2019. The league was announced to feature four titles. The Nationals was envisioned to act as the main pool for national Esports athletes who could compete for the Philippines in international tournaments such as the Asian Games.

The league had six founding corporations:

TheNet.Com
HappyFeet Esports
BrenPro Inc.
Cignal TV Inc.
PLDT Inc.
STI Education Systems Holdings, Inc.
 Gambit Esports

The Nationals (2019–)
The inaugural 2019 season commenced on March 24, 2019, featuring three video game titles. Two conferences were held for each title. Both double round-robin group stage and single-elimination playoffs were adopted as the competition format with the top players in each title and conference playing against each other in the season finale. Six teams entered for the inaugural season, with STI joining mid-season after the Dota2 competition.

For the 2021 season, two divisions were introduced opening The Nationals to non-peofessionals; These divisions are: The Challenger Series which was open to amateurs and the Academy Series which was for players who are enrolled in schools at the time of their participation. The Nationals Draft Series will be introduced with the top players of the Challenger and Academy series eligible to enter.

Teams
The six founding corporate partners of The Nationals fielded teams for the inaugural season of the Esports tournament. As of August 2018, two more franchise slots are still open which if filled would see eight teams participating in The Nationals. The six participating franchise teams including a new team, Suha, were confirmed by Gariath Concepts in February 2019. A team of one of the founding corporate founders.

Organization

Format
The league follows a franchise model, the first Esports league in the Philippines to adopt this format. Other franchised based leagues in the country are the Philippine Basketball Association, the Philippine Super Liga, Premier Volleyball League, and the Philippine Football League. The Nationals is recognized by the Esports National Association of the Philippines

Video game titles
Three titles, belonging to three categories: PC gaming, Mobile gaming, Console gaming, are the main Esports titles played in The Nationals. Gariath Concepts will handle the operations and logistics of the league.

Three titles has been featured in The Nationals: Dota 2 for PC Gaming and Mobile Legends for Mobile gaming and Tekken 7 for the Console gaming category. NBA 2K19 was also proposed to be played in The Nationals.

Broadcasting rights
The Nationals has been broadcast at 5 Plus on ESPN 5 in the Philippines. League matches were also aired at the One Sports through Cignal TV and Cablelink for Philippine-based viewers as well as eGG Network for the viewers across Southeast Asia and Australia. Matches of Road of The Nationals were aired live in the country on ESPN 5.

References

 
2018 establishments in the Philippines
Sports leagues established in 2018
Esports competitions in the Philippines
Professional sports leagues in the Philippines